Gerardo Jiménez Reyes (born 23 June 1988) is a Spanish footballer who plays for Torre Levante as a forward.

Career
Born on 23 June 1988 in Madrid, Reyes is a graduate of Valencia's youth setup. He went on to play for lower league clubs in Spain, starting with the B-team of Comarca Níjar in 2007, before being promoted to the senior squad the following year. He also represented Arroyo, La Roda, Villarrubia, Requena, Burjassot, Catarroja and Paterna. While at Paterna, he scored two hat-tricks. On 7 January 2015, he scored his first hat-trick for the club in a 3–1 victory against Alzira. His second hat-trick came on 18 January 2015, in a 3–2 victory against Utiel.

In 2015, Reyes moved abroad for the first time and joined Maldivian club Eagles. In the following year, he returned to Spain and signed for Tercera División club Atlético Saguntino. On 13 July 2016, he moved to SC Torre Levante of the same tier. 

On 12 June 2017, Reyes joined Colombian club Envigado. He made his league debut on 8 July in a 4–2 defeat against Deportivo Cali.

Statistics

References

External links

1988 births
Living people
Association football forwards
Spanish footballers
Tercera División players
Categoría Primera A players
Envigado F.C. players
Spanish expatriate footballers
Expatriate footballers in Colombia
Footballers from Madrid
CF Torre Levante players
Atlético Saguntino players
La Roda CF players
Club Eagles players